The Battle of Kessler's Cross Lanes, also known as the Battle of Cross Lanes, took place on August 26, 1861 in Nicholas County, Virginia (now West Virginia) as part of the Western Virginia Campaign during the American Civil War.

Battle

On August 26, Brig. Gen. John B. Floyd, commanding Confederate forces in the Kanawha Valley, crossed the Gauley River to attack Col. Erastus Tyler's 7th Ohio Infantry Regiment encamped at Kessler's Cross Lanes. The Union forces were surprised and routed and the regiment was defeated with severe loss. The two wings of Tyler's line retreated in opposite directions. Throughout the rout and carnage Major Jack Casement, at the head of Tyler's left wing, commenced a retrograde march through Confederate territory over mountain ranges to the Elk River and what is now the Town of Clendenin and then on to Charleston, West Virginia without the capture of a man.

Floyd then withdrew to the river and took up a defensive position at Carnifex Ferry. During the month, Gen. Robert E. Lee arrived in western Virginia and attempted to coordinate the forces of Brig. Gens. Floyd, Henry A. Wise, Col. Douglas Micklich and William W. Loring.

References 

 CWSAC Report Update and Resurvey: Individual Battlefield Profiles

Western Virginia campaign
Battles of the Eastern Theater of the American Civil War
Confederate victories of the American Civil War
Battles of the American Civil War in West Virginia
Nicholas County, West Virginia
1861 in the American Civil War
1861 in Virginia
August 1861 events

de:Kampfhandlungen im Kanawha-Tal